William Alexander MacCorkle (May 7, 1857September 24, 1930), was a United States teacher, lawyer, prosecutor, the ninth Governor of West Virginia and state legislator of West Virginia, and financier.

Biography

He was born near Lexington, Virginia. After briefly teaching school in Pocahontas County, West Virginia, he attended Washington and Lee University in Lexington, Virginia. Returning to West Virginia, in 1879, he established a law practice in Charleston and also taught school. From 1880 to 1889, he served as the Kanawha County prosecuting attorney. In 1884 he married Belle Goshorn.

In 1892, as the Democratic Party's candidate, he was elected governor of West Virginia. As governor, MacCorkle advocated increased funding for state institutions and improved transportation. Through an advertising program, he actively promoted the state's natural resources to attract industry. MacCorkle opposed the growing labor movement among coal miners and dispatched the state militia to break a strike.

After leaving office, MacCorkle returned to his Charleston law practice. In his numerous travels, he continued to publicize the state's resources. In 1910, he was elected to the West Virginia Senate. MacCorkle was also a founder and president of the Citizens National Bank, which later merged with the Charleston National Bank. He wrote an autobiography, The Recollections of Fifty Years, which was published in 1928. He died at his Charleston home, Sunrise, in 1930.

Legacy
Maccorkle's mansion, Sunrise, became home to a children's museum in the early 1960s. It was added to the National Register of Historic Places in 1974.  In Charleston, a major arterial road, Maccorkle Avenue, was named for him and carries U.S. Route 60 through the area. His papers form a valuable research resource at the MacCorkle Collection of the West Virginia State History and Archives website.

The children's museum (now called Avampato Discovery Museum) was relocated to The Clay Center about two miles away in downtown Charleston in 2003. The Sunrise estate currently houses the law firm of Farmer Cline & Campbell PLLC.

WM. A MacCorkle on May 9, 1900 in Montgomery, Alabama did address the Southern Conference On Race Problems. The address was entitled The Negro and The Intelligence and Property Franchise. This addressed passionately set forth his opinions advocating for rights for the African Americans.  The Negro and the Intelligence and Property Franchise.

Gallery

References

External links
Biography of William A. MacCorkle
Inaugural Address of William A. MacCorkle

1857 births
1930 deaths
19th-century American educators
19th-century American lawyers
19th-century American politicians
20th-century American lawyers
20th-century American male writers
20th-century American politicians
American bank presidents
Burials at Spring Hill Cemetery (Charleston, West Virginia)
Businesspeople from West Virginia
County prosecuting attorneys in West Virginia
Democratic Party governors of West Virginia
Lawyers from Charleston, West Virginia
People from Lexington, Virginia
Politicians from Charleston, West Virginia
Schoolteachers from West Virginia
Washington and Lee University alumni
Democratic Party West Virginia state senators